Stephen Offei (born 14 January 1986 in Ghana) is a Ghanaian former professional association footballer who played as a centreback. He last played for Vasco S.C. in the Goa Professional League. He represented Ghana national football team in two international matches.

Career
Stephen Offei started his career in youth level in Kumasi club Sahara FC.In 2001 made his first domestic transfer to Accra Hearts of Oak and in his first three seasons there was the most capped player for the club. He played for the Ghana national U-23 team during the 2007 All African Games in Algeria and made his first cap for the Ghana Black Stars against Iran in 2008. He had loans from Accra Hearts of Oak in Bulgaria to PFC Litex Lovech in 2004 and in 2008 with Hapoel Petah Tikva F.C. In 2009, he moved permanent in Israel and sign for Premier League side Maccabi Netanya and after completed season moved to Maccabi Be'er Sheva having a successful year. In 2011, he travelled to China and was so close to finalize a deal with Shanghai Shenhua current club of Nicolas Anelka & Didier Drogba but could not meet the transfers deadline and in September 2012 signed a 1-year contract with India I-League Champions Dempo S.C and performed in 8 Goa league games having a goal in the opener game against his current team. After being released from Dempo he signed a contract with Vasco S.C. that will keep him in India until May 2013.

Offei is well known in Ghana for his mentoring sessions actions and youth football development.

Honours
Ghana Premier League: 2
 2005–06, 2006–07

Charity work
Mentoring sessions and donations made to Future For All Foundation, An NGO in Ghana that supports youth football development at the grassroot level.

References

External links
 Video Highlights
 Signs for Dempo S.C
 Vasco rely promotion chances on Stephen Offei

1986 births
Living people
Association football defenders
Ghanaian footballers
Hapoel Petah Tikva F.C. players
Maccabi Netanya F.C. players
Expatriate footballers in Israel
PFC Litex Lovech players
Expatriate footballers in Bulgaria
Accra Hearts of Oak S.C. players
Ghanaian expatriate sportspeople in Israel
Dempo SC players
First Professional Football League (Bulgaria) players